KZ Andromedae (often abbreviated to KZ And) is a double lined spectroscopic binary in the constellation Andromeda. Its apparent visual magnitude varies between 7.91 and 8.03 during a cycle slightly longer than 3 days.

System
Both stars in the KZ Andromedae system are main sequence stars of spectral type K2Ve, meaning that the spectrum shows strong emission lines. This is caused by their active chromospheres that cause large spots on the surface.

KZ Andromedae is listed in the Washington Double Star Catalog as the secondary component in a visual binary system, with the primary being HD 218739. In 50 years of observations, there is little evidence of relative motion between the two stars; however, they have a common proper motion and a similar radial velocity.

Variability
The rotational velocity of both stars is consistent with a synchronous rotation of the pair, and the rotational period is itself comparable to the brightness variation period. KX Andromedae is thus classified as a BY Draconis variable, and the variability is caused by the large spots on the surface.

References

Andromeda (constellation)
Andromedae, KZ
J23095734+4757300
114379
Spectroscopic binaries
BY Draconis variables
K-type main-sequence stars
Emission-line stars
Gliese and GJ objects
218738